The 1979 McGuinness Men's World Open Squash Championship was the men's edition of the 1979 World Open, which serves as the individual world championship for squash players. The event took place in Toronto in Canada during September 1979. Geoff Hunt won his third consecutive World Open title, defeating Qamar Zaman in a repeat of the 1977 final.

Seeds

Draw and results

First round

Main draw

Notes
Torsam Khan died just two months after this event in the November, at the age of 27. Torsam suffered a heart attack during a tournament in Australia.

See also
PSA World Open
1979 Women's World Open Squash Championship

References

External links
World Squash History

M
World Squash Championships
Squash tournaments in Canada
1979 in Canadian sports
International sports competitions hosted by Canada